Sparse grids are numerical techniques to represent, integrate or interpolate high dimensional functions. They were originally developed by the Russian mathematician Sergey A. Smolyak, a student of Lazar Lyusternik, and are based on a sparse tensor product construction. Computer algorithms for efficient implementations of such grids were later developed by Michael Griebel and Christoph Zenger.

Curse of dimensionality 
The standard way of representing multidimensional functions are tensor or full grids. The number of basis functions or nodes (grid points) that have to be stored and processed depend exponentially on the number of dimensions.

The curse of dimensionality is expressed in the order of the integration error that is made by a quadrature of level , with  points. The function has regularity , i.e. is  times differentiable.

Smolyak's quadrature rule 
Smolyak found a computationally more efficient method of integrating multidimensional functions based on a univariate quadrature rule . The -dimensional Smolyak integral  of a function  can be written as a recursion formula with the tensor product.

If a 1-dimension integration on level  is computed by the evaluation of  points, the error estimate for a function of regularity  will be

Further reading

External links 
 A memory efficient data structure for regular sparse grids
 Finite difference scheme on sparse grids
 Visualization on sparse grids
 Datamining on sparse grids,  J.Garcke, M.Griebel (pdf)

Numerical analysis